This is a list of defunct airlines of Nigeria.

See also

 List of airlines of Nigeria
 List of airports in Nigeria

References

Nigeria
Airlines
Airlines, defunct